Blyth is a small town in the Mid North of South Australia, located  west of the renowned Clare Valley. The town is located on the lands of the Kaurna people, the indigenous people who lived there before European settlement. It has a population of 306, the farming community spanning the plains between the Clare Hills and the Barunga/Hummocks ranges.

Blyth has a General Store, Post Office, Pub and Gallery/Studio, as well as sporting facilities for football, netball, bowls, cricket, tennis and golf. Several businesses based in Blyth service the region. The Blyth Cinema is housed in a renovated Masonic Hall.

History
The township of Blyth was founded in 1875, 15 years after the Hundred of Blyth, in which it was located, was proclaimed.

Railway
In 1876, Blyth was the terminus of the narrow gauge railway to Port Wakefield.

Adjacent stations were Brinkworth to the north and Hoyleton and Halbury to the south.

See also
Ian Roberts (painter)
Stanley Football Association
Jack Cockburn
List of cities and towns in South Australia
Lands administrative divisions of South Australia

References

Towns in South Australia
Mid North (South Australia)